Beau Jesse Garrett (born December 28, 1982) is an American actress and model.  She began her career appearing in GUESS advertisements in the late 1990s after being discovered by an Elite modeling agent at age fourteen. She made her feature film debut in the horror film Turistas (2006) before portraying Captain Raye in Fantastic Four: Rise of the Silver Surfer (2007) and Gem in Tron: Legacy (2010). 

Garrett would later appear as a regular guest star on the television series Criminal Minds: Suspect Behavior (2011) and had a regular role on Girlfriends' Guide to Divorce from 2014 to 2018. In 2017, she portrayed Jessica Preston on the ABC series The Good Doctor.

Early life
Garrett was born at Cedars Sinai Hospital in Los Angeles, on December 28, 1982, as the second child of David and Randi Garrett (née Rowland). She was raised in Topanga, California, in the Santa Monica Mountains where, as a child, she frequently rode horses. In her youth, Garrett became a competitive equestrian. She is the sister of Autumn Meisel (née Garrett) and the cousin of actor Kyle Chandler.

At age 13, Garrett was discovered by an Elite modeling agent while singing Christmas carols with her school's choir in a Los Angeles shopping mall. Her parents agreed to allow her to model to earn money to pay for her horse's boarding fees. She participated at the 1997 Elite Model Look and was one of the semi-finalists at the international finale of the competition. Garrett worked professionally as a model from ages 14 to 21. Commenting on modeling at a young age, she said: "That was such a kind of strange and interesting time, those years, but it wasn’t sustainable for me."

Career
She was first hired by Guess in the late 1990s. In 2008, she became a spokesmodel for Revlon cosmetics, along with Halle Berry, Jessica Biel, Jennifer Connelly and Jessica Alba, and has also modeled for Double D Ranch and CosmoGirl. She is signed to Vision Model Management, Los Angeles.

Garrett was the female lead in a music video for the song "Cold" by the band Crossfade in 2004, before making her feature film debut in the horror film Turistas (2006), opposite Josh Duhamel, Melissa George, and Olivia Wilde. Prior to appearing in film, Garret had made three appearances on television episodes including a pilot, as well as appearances on Entourage. 

In 2007, she was cast in a supporting role as Frankie Raye in Fantastic Four: Rise of the Silver Surfer, the sequel to Fantastic Four. The following year, she had a minor role in the romantic comedy Made of Honor (2008).

In the spring of 2009, she filmed the 2010 film Tron: Legacy in Vancouver, British Columbia, opposite her Turistas co-star Olivia Wilde. In 2010, she also starred in the season-six House episode "Remorse", again with Wilde, as well as the independent crime film Freelancers (2010), starring 50 Cent, Forest Whitaker, and Robert De Niro.

In 2017, Garrett was cast in the role of attorney Jessica Preston in the ABC series The Good Doctor, which was met with significant ratings upon its debut, becoming the most-watched show in U.S. television for 2017.

Filmography

Film

Television

References

External links

 
 
 

1982 births
21st-century American actresses
Actresses from Los Angeles
American female equestrians
American film actresses
American television actresses
Female models from California
Living people
Models from Los Angeles